Cerithiopsis acontium is a species of very small sea snail, a marine gastropod mollusk in the family Cerithiopsidae. This species was described by the American malacologist William Healey Dall in 1889.

Description 
The maximum recorded shell length is 8 mm.

Habitat 
Minimum recorded depth is 183 m. Maximum recorded depth is 183 m.

References

acontium
Taxa named by William Healey Dall
Gastropods described in 1889